Caspase-2 (ICH-1, NEDD-2, caspase-2L, caspase-2S, neural precursor cell expressed developmentally down-regulated protein 2, CASP-2, NEDD2 protein) is an enzyme. This enzyme catalyses the following chemical reaction

 Strict requirement for an Asp residue at P1, with Asp316 being essential for proteolytic activity and has a preferred cleavage sequence of Val-Asp-Val-Ala-Asp-

Caspase-2 is an initiator caspase, as are caspase-8 (EC 3.4.22.61), caspase-9 (EC 3.4.22.62) and caspase-10 (EC 3.4.22.63).

References

External links 
 

EC 3.4.22